Scaramucce is the third studio album of Rondò Veneziano. The music is used in the film Not Quite Paradise.

Track listing
Scaramucce (Gian Piero Reverberi e Laura Giordano) - 3:35
Alla corte del re (Gian Piero Reverberi e Laura Giordano) - 2:54
Arabesco (Gian Piero Reverberi e Laura Giordano) - 3:33
Laguna incantata (Gian Piero Reverberi e Laura Giordano) - 3:55
Campielli (Gian Piero Reverberi e Laura Giordano) - 3:08
Pulcinella (Gian Piero Reverberi e Laura Giordano) - 4:06
Oboe d'amore (Gian Piero Reverberi e Laura Giordano) - 2:37
Re Sole (Gian Piero Reverberi e Laura Giordano) - 3:35
Riflessi sull'acqua (Gian Piero Reverberi e Laura Giordano) - 3:28
Trasparenze (Gian Piero Reverberi e Laura Giordano) - 2:41

References

1982 albums
Rondò Veneziano albums